Electric Love Muffin was a Philadelphia-based hard rocking quartet of the late 1980s that spiked the melodic thrash-pop of The Replacements, Soul Asylum and other indie bands of the period with touches of country/western, classic rock and progressive rock.

History
Electric Love Muffin quickly became a club and college radio favorite in Philadelphia and beyond. The band released two full albums, Playdoh Meathook (1987) and Rassafranna (1989), plus an EP, Second Third Time Around (1990). While the band's original songs won raves from critics, imaginative covers of The Beatles' "Norwegian Wood (This Bird Has Flown)" and the '60s chestnut "Venus" (then best known for Bananarama's version) were highlights of the live set. 

A combination of bad management and bad timing--Nirvana, building on some of the same musical antecedents, would become superstars just 18 months after the Muffin disbanded in spring 1990—kept Electric Love Muffin from the acclaim their fans believed was their due. Even so, their music and live performances remain the stuff of legend, and occasional reunions over the subsequent decade and a half after their breakup thrilled Philadelphia club audiences.

References

Rock music groups from Pennsylvania
Musical groups disestablished in 1990